Greig City Academy is a mixed-sex secondary school in the London borough of Haringey. It has around 1,100 pupils on its roll.

As well as a busy main school, the Academy includes a thriving Sixth Form with links to Russell Group and other universities as well as specialist sports and arts colleges. More than 85% of sixth formers go on to higher education, including Oxford and Cambridge.

Its outdoor education programme is supported by the Greig Trust.  The programme enables students across the school to experience activities such as abseiling, mountain biking, canoeing, kayaking, sailing, rock climbing and much more. In particular, the school has its own fleet of boats, several of which are moored in the Solent. The school was the first and only state school to compete in the 2017 Fastnet Race. It will compete in the 2019 race with crew members aged 13 and up. @GCASailingClub.

Greig City Academy is the only state school in Haringey to offer a classics course and a Latin GCSE. The school is also part of the Mandarin Excellence Programme.

The Greig Trust and the Church of England co-sponsor the Academy. David Greig, a successful local businessman, founded the Greig Trust in memory of his mother in 1949. The school receives sponsorship for STEM from the Tallow Chandlers Livery Company.

Sixth-former Montel Fagan-Jordan was awarded Young Sailor of the Year in January 2018.

Achievements 
The school has a strong STEM offering with teams of pupils winning the UK Robotics Championships and competing in the World Championships in Kentucky in 2015, 2016 and 2017. Several teams reached national level in 2018 and 2019. The school is working with associated primary schools to improve STEM across Haringey and has a STEM aptitude stream.

Greig City Academy is the only state school in the UK with a competitive sailing yacht.

Haringey Council's Outstanding for All Awards:
The school's Robotics team won the Outstanding Achievement Award for STEM in 2018 and Joye Manyan won the Governor of the Year award.
Head of Sixth Form, Jon Holt, won the Councillor Egan Outstanding Achievement Award 2017. Student Jackie Lee won the Achievement in the Arts Award 2017. 
The outdoor education programme won the Sports Award in 2016. A robotics team from the school won the STEM Award in 2016. Students in previous years have also won arts and sports awards.

The school is an affiliated school of the UK-wide Arkwright Scholarships and its students regularly secure the prestigious Arkwright Engineering Scholarships.
 
GCA was one of 10 schools selected to run the Falcon Initiative project (sponsored by the Royal Aeronautical Society and Boeing) - to design and build a fully functional flight training simulator for under £500.

The school's Progress 8 scores for GCSE 2016 place it in the top 2% of schools in the country for high achievers and girls.

References

External links
 Greig City Academy website

 Montel is named Young Sailor of the Year
 http://www.hamhighbroadway.co.uk/home/tracy_edwards_visits_hornsey_school_1_4044652 Tracy Edwards visits Hornsey School
 http://www.hamhighbroadway.co.uk/news/education/greig_city_academy_pupils_triumph_in_national_robotics_contest_1_4001576
 http://positiveyouthnewsharingey.co.uk/989/
 http://www.hamhighbroadway.co.uk/sport/football/greig_city_academy_s_bravo_harriott_named_england_basketball_s_player_of_the_year_1_3454282
 https://web.archive.org/web/20150706135305/http://www.hamhigh.co.uk/property/hornsey_victorian_suburb_turned_cosmopolitan_area_on_the_up_1_3943390
 http://www.tallowchandlers.org/education-charity/how-weve-helped-greig-city-academy

Educational institutions established in 2002
Academies in the London Borough of Haringey
Church of England secondary schools in the Diocese of London
Secondary schools in the London Borough of Haringey
2002 establishments in England
Hornsey